Walter Perkins may refer to:

 Walter Perkins (musician) (1932–2004), American jazz drummer
 Walter Perkins (Stroud MP) (1903–1988), Conservative Party politician in England
 Walter E. Perkins (1859–1925), American stage and film actor
 Walter Perkins (New Forest MP), British Member of Parliament for New Forest, 1910–1922